Tan Kim Her (born November 11, 1971) is a former Malaysian badminton player and coach. He is currently Japan's men's doubles coach.

Career 
Kim Her competed in badminton at the 1996 Summer Olympics in men's doubles with Soo Beng Kiang. They defeated the no.3 seeds Rudy Gunawan and Bambang Suprianto of Indonesia in the last 16. In the semi final, Kim Her and Beng Kiang lost to the eventual gold medallist, Rexy Mainaky and Ricky Subagja of Indonesia. In the bronze medal match, the duo lost hard fought match also to the Indonesian pair, Antonius Ariantho/Denny Kantono.

Achievements

World Cup 
Men's doubles

Asian Championships 
Men's doubles

Mixed doubles

Asian Cup 
Men's doubles

Mixed doubles

Southeast Asian Games 
Men's doubles

Mixed doubles

Commonwealth Games 
Men's doubles

IBF World Grand Prix 
The World Badminton Grand Prix sanctioned by International Badminton Federation (IBF) from 1983 to 2006.

Men's doubles

IBF International 
Men's doubles

Coaching 
Tan became a coach after his playing career, coaching the Malaysian junior squad for six years. Then, he became the first Malaysian to coach abroad when he joined the South Korean national team in 2005. In 2007, he joined the England national team. In 2010, he left and returned to coach in his homeland Malaysia. In 2015, he was appointed as an Indian men's doubles coach, before resigning in March 2019. He was credited for the rise of world No. 8 men's doubles Satwiksairaj Rankireddy-Chirag Shetty. He then joined the Japanese national team as men's doubles coach, guiding world No. 4 Takuro Hoki-Yugo Kobayashi to the world title in 2021.

References

External links 
 Profile at Olympic.org
 Profile at sports-reference.com

1971 births
Living people
Malaysian sportspeople of Chinese descent
Malaysian male badminton players
Asian Games medalists in badminton
Asian Games bronze medalists for Malaysia
Badminton players at the 1994 Asian Games
Badminton players at the 1994 Commonwealth Games
Olympic badminton players of Malaysia
Badminton players at the 1996 Summer Olympics
Commonwealth Games medallists in badminton
Medalists at the 1994 Asian Games
Southeast Asian Games medalists in badminton
Commonwealth Games silver medallists for Malaysia
Competitors at the 1993 Southeast Asian Games
Competitors at the 1997 Southeast Asian Games
Southeast Asian Games silver medalists for Malaysia
Southeast Asian Games bronze medalists for Malaysia
Medallists at the 1994 Commonwealth Games